is a Japanese singer and actress. She is a member of the Japanese idol girl group HKT48 and is a former member of the South Korean-Japanese girl group Iz*One after the competition television show Produce 48.

She joined HKT48 in November 2013. From 2015 to 2017, she was a concurrent member of AKB48. In 2018, she competed in the South Korean survival show Produce 48. She placed sixth and debuted as a member of Iz*One. She is an exclusive model for Love Berry. Yabuki is also known for her role as young Minami Asakura in the film Touch (2005).

Career
Yabuki made her film debut as young Minami Asakura in the coming-of-age film Touch in 2005. Two years later, she appeared in JCB and Dainichi (ja) commercials. In 2009, she appeared in the made for television films Detective Samonji Susumu and My Father's Longest Day.
She appeared in a Koala's March commercial in 2011. In 2012, she appeared in the short film On the Shinhori River. The following year, she appeared in the tokusatsu superhero film Gatchaman.

Yabuki is a fan of Rino Sashihara. During an AKB48 handshake event, she met Sashihara, who told her to audition for the group. Yabuki decided to audition for HKT48 instead, after Sashihara was demoted and transferred to HKT48. In 2013, she passed the third generation auditions for HKT48.

In 2018, Nako participated in reality girl group survival show Produce 48, and after ranking #6 in the final ranking, she placed in the top twelve, and became a member of Korean-Japanese idol group Iz*One. She and the other two Japanese members of the group took a hiatus from their respective Japanese groups until their contracts with Iz*One expire in April 2021.

On April 29, 2021, her contract with Iz*One officially expired and she and the other two Japanese members returned to Japan. On May 15, 2021, Nako officially resumed HKT48 activities with a theater appearance.

On October 16, 2022, during HKT48's 11th anniversary concert, she announced her graduation from the group with a graduation concert which would be held on April 1, 2023.

On January 28, 2023, Yabuki's contract with Vernalossom expired.

AKB48 general election placements

Since her debut in 2013, Yabuki has taken part in five of AKB48's annual general elections. Her placements were as follows :

Discography

Songwriting credits

Filmography

Film

Television series

Television shows

Hosting

Bibliography

Magazines
 Love Berry, Tokuma Shoten 2001–, exclusive model since 2016.

Notes

References

External links

 Nako Yabuki  - Iz*One Japan Official Site

2001 births
Living people
21st-century Japanese women singers
Actresses from Tokyo
AKB48 members
HKT48 members
Iz*One members
J-pop singers
Japanese child actresses
Japanese child singers
Japanese dance musicians
Japanese expatriates in South Korea
Japanese women pop singers
Japanese film actresses
Japanese female idols
Japanese K-pop singers
Japanese television actresses
Korean-language singers of Japan
Singers from Tokyo
Swing Entertainment artists
Produce 48 contestants
Reality show winners